Olly Ashall-Bott (born 24 November 1997) is an English professional rugby league footballer who plays as a  or er for the Toulouse Olympique in the Betfred Super League.

He previously played for the Huddersfield Giants, Wakefield Trinity and Widnes Vikings in the Super League and the Betfred Championship, and on loan from Widnes at the North Wales Crusaders in Betfred League 1. Ashall-Bott also played for the London Broncos in the Championship and spent time away from the Broncos at the Salford Red Devils in the Betfred Super League. He spent time on loan from Huddersfield at Wakefield Trinity in Super League XXVI.

Background
Ashall-Bott was born as Oliver Ashall in Widnes, Cheshire, England.

Personal life
Ashall-Bott is in a relationship with England and Bayern Munich footballer Georgia Stanway.

Career

Widnes Vikings
He made his début for the Widnes Vikings against Castleford in 2018. He went on to play 6 more games scoring one try (Hull KR) and heading on loan to North Wales Crusaders scoring 3 tries in three games. He played 7 games in the 2019 championship season scoring once.

London Broncos
On 25 September 2019 it was announced that Ashall-Bott had joined the London Broncos.

On 25 September 2020 Ashall-Bott agreed a temporary loan deal with the Salford Red Devils.

Huddersfield Giants
On 25 Jan 2021 it was reported that he had signed for the Huddersfield Giants in the Super League.

Wakefield Trinity (loan)
On 26 Apr 2021 it was reported that he had signed for Wakefield Trinity in the Super League on a short-term 2-week long loan.

Toulouse Olympique
In February 2022 it was announced that Ashall-Bott had signed for Toulouse Olympique.

References

External links
Widnes Vikings profile
SL profile

1997 births
Living people
English rugby league players
Huddersfield Giants players
London Broncos players
North Wales Crusaders players
Rugby league fullbacks
Rugby league wingers
Salford Red Devils players
Rugby league players from Widnes
Toulouse Olympique players
Wakefield Trinity players
Widnes Vikings players